Olga Lepeshinskaya may refer to:

Olga Lepeshinskaya (biologist) (1871–1963), Soviet biologist
Olga Lepeshinskaya (dancer) (1916–2008), Soviet ballerina